Broda may refer to:

Places
 Broda, Pomeranian Voivodeship, a village in north Poland 
 Broda, a part of Neubrandenburg, Germany

People with the name
 Broda (surname)
 Broda Otto Barnes (1906–1988), American physician
 Broda Shaggi (born 1993), Nigerian comedian

See also
 
Brode (disambiguation)
Braude (disambiguation)
Broder